"Let It Flow" is a song by American R&B singer Toni Braxton. Written and produced by Babyface, the song was originally recorded for, and included on, the soundtrack to the 1995 motion picture Waiting to Exhale.

"Let It Flow" was released as a double A-side with "You're Makin' Me High", the lead single from Braxton's second studio album, Secrets (1996). At the time the single was issued, "Let It Flow" was already receiving strong radio airplay in the United States, and the two tracks eventually topped the Billboard Hot 100 and Hot R&B/Hip-Hop Songs charts.

Music video
The music video for "Let It Flow" directed by Herb Ritts features water imagery throughout. Toni is shown singing while surrounded by men painted blue facing away from her, and this is interspersed with shots of the men behind and in front of screens of water flowing. Toni is also shown singing while sitting on a white float in the middle of a still body of water.

Reception
The double-A side single debuted at number seven on the Hot 100 and number two on the Hot R&B Singles chart, the issue dated June 8, 1996, becoming her highest-debuting single. It eventually topped the Hot 100 chart for a week, and the Hot R&B Singles chart for two weeks, which was her first number one single on both charts. Due to its staying power on the Hot R&B Singles chart, it was the #1 R&B Single on the 1996's Billboard year-end charts. The single sold over 1,500,000 copies in the United States and was certified Platinum by the RIAA on July 17, 1996.

Just as soon as the soundtrack was released, the song received critical acclaim, being chosen as one of the best tracks on the album by critics. Stephen Holden, the music critic of the New York Times, called it "small pop coup" and added "Braxton snaps out the words with a choked intensity, her dark, grainy contralto conveying a potent mixture of fury and sensuality."

Personnel and credits 

Credits adapted from album liner notes.

 Toni Braxton: lead vocals, background vocals
 Kenneth "Babyface" Edmonds: writer, producer, keyboards, guitar, programming
 Reggie Griffin: guitar
 Brad Gilderman: recording

 Jon Gass: mixing
 Paul Boutin, Larry Schalit, Robbes Stieglietz, Kyle Bess: assistant engineers
 Randy Walker: midi programming
 Ivy Skoff: production coordinator

Charts

Weekly charts

Year-end charts

Decade-end charts

References

See also
 R&B number-one hits of 1996 (USA)
 Hot 100 number-one hits of 1996 (United States)
 Number-one dance hits of 1996 (USA)

1990s ballads
1995 songs
1995 singles
Billboard Hot 100 number-one singles
Music videos directed by Herb Ritts
Pop ballads
Contemporary R&B ballads
Songs written for films
Songs written by Babyface (musician)
Toni Braxton songs
Song recordings produced by Babyface (musician)
LaFace Records singles